Pre, often written as PRE, is a British noise rock band, releasing music on the labels Skin Graft Records and Lovepump United. It is based in London and was formed around 2005. Pre includes former members of Todd and Seafood. Guitar player John Webb is also a member of the noise rock band Male Bonding along with Kevin Hendrick.

Discography
 Treasure Trails (EP and 7" on Blood of the Drash)
 Pre // demonstrations // AIDS Wolf // Crack und Ultra Eczema (2x7" gatefold 4-band split on Lovepump United)
 Their track "Dudefuk" appears on Rough Trade Shop's 2006 compilation CD of Counter Culture
 10" Split with Bardo Pond on 'Keep Mother' Series
 Epic Fits CD on Skin Graft Records & LP on Lovepump United, 17 September 2007
 7" Split with Comanechi on Merok Records
 7" Split with Crystal Castles/Teenagers/Whisky vs Faith on Merok/Rough Trade
 7" Split with AIDS Wolf on Skin Graft Records (2007)

Interviews and reviews

References

External links
 Home Page
 Pre at Lovepump United Records
 Official site of Comanechi, a side project of Keex

English noise rock groups
English indie rock groups
Underground punk scene in the United Kingdom